Ferdinand Odzakov was  a Director of Military Service for Security and Intelligence of Army of the Republic of Macedonia  of Macedonia.

References

Living people
Macedonian politicians
1969 births
People from Gjilan